Adelaide Johnson is an Australian netball player. Johnson played with the Sydney Swifts in the Commonwealth Bank Trophy from 2005–07, winning two premierships in the last two years of the competition. With the start of the ANZ Championship in 2008, Johnson was selected to play for the New South Wales Swifts in the inaugural season, where she was the first Goal Keeper to stop Waikato Bay of Plenty Magic's dominance. During the same season, Johnson also  managed to save the Swifts from losing against the Queensland Firebirds in the dying seconds of the game, when a contact call went in Johnson's favour and her opponent, Jamaican Goal Shooter Romelda Akien was penalised.

Despite offers from both the Swifts and the Mystics Johnson did not sign to play in the 2009 ANZ Championship season.

References

1986 births
Living people
Australian netball players
Sydney Swifts players
New South Wales Swifts players
Netball players from New South Wales
New South Wales Institute of Sport netball players